Mrgastan (until 1935, Gadzhilar and Hajjilar) is a village in the Armavir Province of Armenia. The town's church, dedicated to Saint Hovhannes, was built in 1912.

See also 
Armavir Province

References 

Populated places in Armavir Province